Misanthro-Thérapie (15 Années d'Analyse) is a compilation of music by the French progressive death metal band Misanthrope. This compilation set was limited to 2,000 units, including 2 DVDs containing live songs,
interviews and more. Chair Organique features Ludovic Loez and Conte Fantasmagorique features Stille Volk.

Track listing

Disc 1

 "Titan Fall" - 1:38
 "Inspiration" - 4:08
 "Le Bestiaire Souterrain" - 4:55
 "Emmurement" - 4:52
 "Estampe Géopolitique" - 4:50
 "Amour Anthropophage" - 5:46
 "L´antéchrist" - 4:43
 "Crimes, Tyrannie et Châtiments" - 5:05
 "Contemplation" - 4:59
 "Chair Organique" - 4:51
 "Bassiste-de-coeur" - 2:51
 "Conte Fantasmagorique" - 4:42
 "Exsilium Existentia" - 3:59

Disc 2

 "Into Perdition" (live) - 1:11
 "La Marche des Cornus" (live) - 6:17
 "Eden Massacre" (live) - 5:04
 "Les Lamentations du Diable" (live) - 4:59
 "Les Empereurs du Néant" (live) - 5:38
 "Révisionniste" (live) - 5:45
 "Intro to R.I.P." (Coroner cover) - 1:22
 "Reborn Through Hate" (Coroner cover) - 5:00
 "Suicide Nation" (At the Gates cover) - 3:33
 "Real Nature" (SUP cover) - 6:01
 "L’élite" (Trust cover) - 3:56
 "Le Scarabéidé Bleu" - 3:55

External links
Misanthro-Thérapie (15 Années d'Analyse) @ Encyclopaedia Metallum

Misanthrope (band) albums
2004 compilation albums